snRNA-activating protein complex subunit 5 is a protein that in humans is encoded by the SNAPC5 gene.

References

Further reading

External links